Poto Poto is a puzzle arcade game created by Sega of Japan in 1994. It was built on the Sega System C2.

Gameplay
Either one player against the computer or two human players manage a pushcart full of hexagonal tiles. Tiles fall out of your basket and slide down the board of other tiles to match up with the end of your structure in a honeycomb fashion. If pieces that support lower pieces break, the entire hanging structure breaks. Breaking tiles in groups of three is a good thing which awards points. The goal is to keep your board fairly clear while hoping that your opponent makes enough mistakes to touch the bottom and lose.

Reception 
In Japan, Game Machine listed Poto Poto on their May 15, 1994 issue as being the tenth most-successful table arcade unit of the month.

References

External links
Recorded best scores can be found here for use in MAME: http://marp.retrogames.com/r/potopoto

1994 video games
Arcade video games
Arcade-only video games
Sega arcade games
Puzzle video games
Video games developed in Japan